Landås Church is a parish church of the Church of Norway in Bergen Municipality in Vestland county, Norway. It is located in the Landås neighborhood in the Årstad borough of the city of Bergen. It is the church for the Landås parish which is part of the Bergensdalen prosti (deanery) in the Diocese of Bjørgvin. The white, concrete church was built in a fan-shaped design with a very modern style in 1966 using plans drawn up by the architect Ola Kielland-Lund. The church seats about 600 people.

History
The new parish of Landås was established in 1959 when it was separated from the Fridalen Church parish. Planning began soon after for a church for the new parish. An architectural competition held in 1961 to determine the designer of the new building. It was won by Ola Kielland-Lund. Construction on the church took place from 1964-1966. It was consecrated on 26 November 1966. The church is notable for its unique roof line. It is made up of several curved sections of differing heights, giving a cascade-like appearance.

See also
List of churches in Bjørgvin

References

Churches in Bergen
Concrete churches in Norway
Fan-shaped churches in Norway
20th-century Church of Norway church buildings
Churches completed in 1966
1966 establishments in Norway